The 2007 Asian Karate Championships are the 8th edition of the Asian Karate Championships, and were held in Nilai Indoor Stadium, Seremban, Malaysia from August 24 to August 26, 2007.

Medalists

Men

Women

Medal table

References
 Results

External links
 AKF Official Website

Asian Championships
Asian Karate Championships
Asian Karate Championships
Karate Championships